5-MeO-MALT (5-methoxy-N-methyl-N-allyltryptamine) is a lesser-known psychedelic drug that is closely related to 5-MeO-DALT and has been sold online as a designer drug.

Legality
5-MeO-MALT is illegal in Hungary.

Sweden's public health agency suggested classifying 5-MeO-MALT as a hazardous substance, on May 15, 2019.

See also
 4-HO-MALT
 5-MeO-DET
 5-MeO-DiPT
 5-MeO-DMT
 5-MeO-DPT
 5-MeO-EiPT
 5-MeO-MiPT

References

Designer drugs
Phenols
Psychedelic tryptamines
Serotonin receptor agonists